Andrea A. Hayes Dixon (born 1965) is an American surgeon. She was the first pediatric surgeon to perform a high-risk, life-saving procedure in children with a rare form of cancer and developed the first orthotropic xenograft model of metastatic Ewing's sarcoma. In 2002, she became the first African American female pediatric surgeon board-certified in the United States.

Dixon is the Chairwoman of Surgery at Howard University Hospital.

Early life and education
Dixon was born in Los Angeles, California in 1965. She enrolled at Dartmouth College for a Bachelor of Arts degree in Religion but accepted an opportunity to work in a leukemia lab at the medical school. Dixon then enrolled at Geisel School of Medicine wanting to be a pediatrician but was inspired by Thomas Colacchio to shift her focus. While completing her sub-internship at Stanford University, she studied pediatric surgery and chose to pursue the profession as a career.

Career
Upon graduating from medical school, Dixon decided to focus on pediatric surgery but was rejected three times from hospitals for their training programs. When her mentor asked why she was being rejected, one surgeon replied that bringing in the first black woman was too much of a risk for his program. As a result, Hayes-Jordan went to a training program in Toronto and in 2002, she became the first black, female, board-certified pediatric surgeon in the United States. She started working with children with cancer at St. Jude's Hospital before specifically focusing on abdomen cancer.

Six years later, Dixon developed the first orthotropic xenograft model of metastatic Ewing's sarcoma while simultaneously completing the first cytoreductive surgery and hyper-thermic intraperitoneal chemotherapy HIPEC for children with sarcomatosis. By 2006, Dixon became the first surgeon in the United States to successfully use hyperthermic intraperitoneal chemotherapy on a child. During the 12-hour operation, she removed all the tumors before pumping a chemotherapy drug heated to 103 degrees throughout the abdominal cavity.

UNC
In 2018, Dixon was appointed Chief of the Division of Pediatric Surgery at UNC School of Medicine and named Surgeon-in-Chief at the North Carolina Children's Hospital. While serving in this role, she was appointed by President Donald Trump to sit on the National Cancer Advisory Board, where she would advise and assist the National Cancer Institute Director on the activities of the National Cancer Program. On September 25, 2019, Hayes-Jordan was honored with the Byah Thomason Doxey-Sanford Doxey Distinguished Professorship.

During the COVID-19 pandemic in North America, Dixon was named to American Pediatric Surgical Association's board of directors and elected President of the Society of Black Academic Surgeons, replacing Martin Karpeh. She was also recognized by the Triangle Business Journal as one of its 2020 Health Care Heroes for her "outstanding accomplishments as a surgeon, teacher, and leader."

Personal life
Dixon was married to former National Football League linebacker Darin Jordan; the couple had two children.She is now married to Philadelphia author Hugh Nichols Dixon Sr.

Selected papers

References

Living people
1965 births
University of Texas MD Anderson Cancer Center faculty
University of North Carolina at Chapel Hill faculty
Dartmouth College alumni
Geisel School of Medicine alumni
African-American women physicians
African-American physicians
American pediatric surgeons
American women academics
21st-century African-American people
20th-century African-American people
20th-century African-American women
21st-century African-American women